The Andaman and Nicobar Islands are part of India.  Folk traditions of the area include that of the Moken sea-farers and various kinds of ritual tribal dance.

Andaman and Nicobar culture show a mix of the indigenous cultures of the settlers of the island, as well as a more mainstream culture brought down by the descendants of the early settlers in the island from the Indian mainland. The migrants also contributed to the culture of the Andaman and Nicobar Islands. The greatest feature of Andaman and Nicobar culture is the peaceful coexistence of these two strains of cultural lives.

Cultural Patterns of the Indigenous Tribes of Andaman and Nicobar

The most distinguishing aspect of Andaman and Nicobar culture is the culture of the indigenous people of the islands. Andaman and Nicobar islanders can be divided into two major groups. The main ethnic groups of the Andamans are the Andamanese, Onge, Jarawa, and Sentinelese. The main groups of Nicobar tribes are the Nicobari (Nicobarese) and Shompen. The islanders celebrate most Indian festivals like Durga Puja, Pongal, Panguni Uthiram, Onam, Mahashivratri, Janamashtmi, Holi, Diwali, Christmas and Good Friday with dance and music. Nicobari dance is the traditional dance of Andaman and Nicobar. It can be seen during the Ossuary Feast, commonly known as the Pig Festival. The Andamanese are fond of their traditional music. The dancers move gracefully to the music and song of the onge tribe.

All these tribes have continued with their indigenous culture at Andaman and Nicobar islands, and still, continue to do so. The relative isolation of these tribes has helped to preserve these streams of Andaman and Nicobar culture.

Andaman and Nicobar Islands